The discography of M People, a British house music band, consists of four studio albums, one remix album, five compilation albums, one extended play and twenty-one singles.

Albums

Studio albums

Compilation albums

Remix albums

Extended plays

Singles

Promotional singles

Videos

Video albums

References

Discographies of British artists